Pirates of the Caribbean: At World's End Remixes is an EP released in 2007 which features remixes by Paul Oakenfold and other DJs of the track "Jack Sparrow" composed by Hans Zimmer for the Disney film Pirates of the Caribbean: At World's End.

Track listing
"Jack's Suite" (Paul Oakenfold Mix) – 6:51
"Jack's Suite" (Paul Oakenfold Mix Radio Edit) – 3:38
"Jack's Suite" (The Crystal Method Mix) – 6:04
"Jack's Suite" (The Crystal Method Mix Radio Edit) – 3:47
"Pirates Live Forever" (Ryeland Allison Remix) – 5:43

External links
Pirates of the Caribbean website

Pirates of the Caribbean music
2007 EPs
2007 remix albums
Remix EPs
Walt Disney Records EPs
Walt Disney Records remix albums